The 1977 Chattanooga Moccasins football team represented the University of Tennessee at Chattanooga as a member of the Southern Conference (SoCon) during the 1977 NCAA Division I football season. The Moccasins were led by fifth-year head coach Joe Morrison and played their home games at Charmerlain Field. They compiled an overall record of 9–1–1 with a mark of 4–1 in conference play, sharing the SoCon title with VMI.

Schedule

References

Chattanooga
Chattanooga Mocs football seasons
Southern Conference football champion seasons
Chattanooga Moccasins football